Zann may refer to:

 Lenore Zann (born 1959), a Canadian actress and politician
 Richard Zann (1944–2009), an Australian ornithologist
 Eric Zann, an alias of electronic musician Jim Jupp
 Zann, a fictional deity in Forgotten Realms
 Tyber Zann, leader of the Zann Consortium, a criminal organization in the video game Star Wars: Empire at War: Forces of Corruption
 Zann Mureed, a 2018 Pakistani drama serial

See also
 "The Music of Erich Zann", a horror short story by American author H. P. Lovecraft